Sorochyntsi Fair or Sorochynsky Fair (translit. Natsiolnal'nyi Sorochyns'kyi yarmarok, translit. Sorochinskaya yarmarka) is a large fair held in the village of Velyki Sorochyntsi near Poltava in the Myrhorod Raion (district) of Ukraine.

It was held five times a year during the Russian Empire, then went into a 40-year moratorium during Soviet rule. It has been held annually since its revival after Ukraine became independent in 1991, except 2020.

Following a Presidential Decree of August 18, 1999, the fair holds the status of Ukraine's national trade fair.

The fair is a large showcase for traditional handicrafts made by skilled craftsmen, including Reshetilivka embroidery, rugs, Opishnya ceramics, as well theatrical performers who re-enact scenes of village life from famous Ukrainian stories. The August 2007 fair was opened by Ukrainian President Viktor Yushchenko.

The historic Sorochyntsi Fair features in a number of Ukrainian and Russian works of literature and music, including "The Fair at Sorochyntsi", a short story by Nikolai Gogol, and The Fair at Sorochyntsi, an opera by Modest Mussorgsky.

References

External links

Sorochyntsi Fair
Yakim Davydenko. In Sorochintsy at the fair. Photo essay. Kharkiv, Prapor, 1978. 
Photos of Sorochyntsi Fair 2007
Photos of Sorochyntsi Fair 2010
 Photos of Sorochyntsi Fair 2013

Annual fairs
Trade fairs in Ukraine
Fairs in Ukraine
Tourist attractions in Poltava Oblast